Jérémy Bescond (born 27 February 1991 in Douarnenez) is a French cyclist.

Major results
2010
 1st Prologue Tour du Gévaudan Languedoc-Roussillon (TTT)
2012
 5th Overall Rhône-Alpes Isère Tour
2015
 10th Overall Tour of Rwanda
2016
 3rd Overall Kreiz Breizh Elites
2018
 8th Overall Tour de Bretagne

References

1991 births
Living people
French male cyclists